Balad District may refer to:

Balad District, Iraq
Balad District, Somalia
Al-Balad, Jeddah